RealMedia is a proprietary multimedia container format created by RealNetworks with the filename extension . RealMedia is generally used in conjunction with RealVideo and RealAudio, while also being used for streaming content over the Internet. Typically these streams are in CBR (constant bitrate), but a container for VBR (variable bitrate) streams named RMVB (RealMedia variable bitrate) has been developed.

Overview 

A RealMedia file consists of a series of chunks that can be of several different types:
 .RMF: RealMedia file header
 PROP: File properties header
 MDPR: Media properties header
 CONT: Content description header
 DATA: Data header
 INDX: Index header

Supported audio formats 

 RealAudio 1.0 (VSELP), 
 RealAudio 2.0 (LD-CELP), 28_8
 AC3, 
 
 Cook, cook
 ATRAC3, 
 RealAudio Lossless Format, 
 LC-AAC, 
 HE-AAC,

Supported video formats 
 ClearVideo (from helix spec)
 H.263, RV10
 H.263, RV13
 H.263+, RV20
 H.264 precursor, RV30
 H.264 precursor, RV40
 H.263+ (RV20), RVTR

See also
 RealPlayer
 Container format
 Comparison of video container formats
 Comparison of video player software
 RealVideo codecs
 RealAudio codecs
 Helix Community - the free and open source software project from RealNetworks

Digital container formats
Media